The World Federation of Trade Unions (WFTU) is an international federation of trade unions established in 1945.  Founded in the immediate aftermath of World War Two, the organization built on the pre-war legacy of the International Federation of Trade Unions as a single structure for trade unions world-wide. With the emergence of the Cold War in the late 1940s, the WFTU splintered, with most trade unions from the Western-aligned countries leaving and creating the International Confederation of Free Trade Unions (ICFTU) in 1949.  Throughout the Cold War, membership of the WFTU was made up predominantly of trade unions from the Soviet-aligned and non-aligned countries.  However, there were notable exceptions to this, such as the Yugoslav and Chinese unions, which departed following the Tito-Stalin and Sino-Soviet splits, respectively, or the French CGT and Italian CGIL unions, who were members.  With the end of the Cold War and the dissolution of the Soviet Union, the WFTU lost the largest portion of its membership and financial support. Since the start of the 2000s, the organization shifted headquarters to Athens and recruited new members, claiming to have grown from representing 48 million workers in 2005 to 105 million in 2022.

History

Rise
Its mission was to bring together trade unions across the world in a single international organization, much like the United Nations. After a number of Western trade unions left it in 1949, as a result of disputes over support for the Marshall Plan, to form the International Confederation of Free Trade Unions (ICFTU), the WFTU was made up primarily of unions affiliated with or allegedly sympathetic to communist parties. In the context of the Cold War, the WFTU was often portrayed in the West as a Soviet front organization. A number of those unions, including those from Yugoslavia and China, left later when their governments had ideological differences with the Soviet Union.

Decline
The WFTU declined as a result of the collapse of the Soviet Union and socialist governments in Eastern Europe, in particular in Europe, with many of its former constituent unions joining the ICFTU. That fall seems to have come to an end since the congress in Havana in 2005 where a new leadership was elected with Georges Mavrikos, a Greek union activist from PAME, leading member of the Communist Party of Greece (KKE), at its head.

In January 2006 it moved headquarters from Prague, Czech Republic to Athens, Greece and reinvigorated its activity by putting focus on organizing regional federations of unions in the Third World, by organizing campaigns against imperialism, racism, poverty, environmental degradation and exploitation of workers under capitalism and in defense of full employment, social security, health protection, and trade union rights. The WFTU devotes much of its energy to organizing conferences, issuing statements and producing educational materials and courses for trade union leaders.

In recent years, the WFTU has successfully managed to recruit several trade unions of importance in Europe, amongst which the Rail Maritime Trade Union in Great Britain, the Unione Sindicale di Base in Italy. In France, the CGT National Federation of Agri-Food and Forestry has maintained its affiliation with the WFTU. The CGT National Federation of Chemical Industries sent delegates to the last congress in Athens in 2011. In 2013, two local CGT railway workers branches have taken steps to become affiliates with the WFTU.

The different offices of the WFTU across the different continents organize regular exchanges and militant visits of trade union activists from an affiliate to another in order to further discussions, foster internationalist ties, establish an international activity of its affiliates around shared objectives and campaigns, against common adversaries.

In Africa, unions of major importance such as COSATU in South Africa have affiliated with the WFTU.

As part of its efforts to advance its international agenda, the WFTU develops working partnerships with national and industrial trade unions worldwide as well as with a number of international and regional trade union organizations including the Organization of African Trade Union Unity (OATUU), the International Confederation of Arab Trade Unions (ICATU), the Permanent Congress of Trade Union Unity of Latin America (CPUSTAL), and the General Confederation of Trade Unions of CIS countries.

The WFTU holds consultative status with the Economic and Social Council of the United Nations, the ILO, UNESCO, FAO, and other UN agencies. It maintains permanent missions in New York, Geneva, and Rome.

Affiliates

National Affiliates 

Example of National affiliates of the WFTU include:

General Federation of Trade Unions of Korea
All-Workers Militant Front
Unione Sindacale di Base
Bangladesh Trade Union Centre
Vietnam General Confederation of Labour
Confederation of Progressive Trade Unions of Turkey
National Union of Rail, Maritime and Transport Workers
Congress of South African Trade Unions
Bolivian Workers' Center
Workers' Central Union of Cuba
General Union of Palestinian Workers (GUPW)
Confederación General de Trabajadores del Perú
General Federation of Trade Unions
All India Trade Union Congress
Centre of Indian Trade Unions
All India Central Council of Trade Unions
Intersindical-CSC
Coordinadora Obrera Sindical
Coordinadora Sindical de Clase
Frente Sindical Obrero de Canarias
Confederation Intersindical Galega
Langile Abertzaleen Batzordeak
Workers' House
Unidade Classista
Central dos Trabalhadores e Trabalhadoras do Brasil
United Trade Unions of Serbia "Sloga"
All-China Federation of Trade Unions
Labor United Educational League (LUEL) 
Union of Trade Unions of Monaco
National Federation of Agri-Food and Forestry and National Federation of Chemical Industries from General Confederation of Labour

Trade Union Internationals 
During the late 1940s, the WFTU unsuccessfully tried to reach an agreement with already existing international trade secretariats. When the Union split in 1949 they were left without an organization at the level of specific industries, leading to the creation of the Trade Union International (TUI) system.

The TUI system has gone through a number of transformations in its over 60 years of existence. The following Trade Unions Internationals are constituted within the WFTU:
 World Federation of Teachers Unions – known by its French acronym FISE, this is the earliest affiliated union, founded in 1946. It maintained a degree of independence from the WFTU not exercised by the other TUIs.
 In 1949, the 2nd World Congress decided to create a series of sectoral unions, after their negotiations with already existing international trade secretariats failed. At first these were known as Trade Departments or International Federations, but they adopted the appellation "Trade Union Internationals" by the mid-1950s. The original TUIs formed in 1949 and 1950 were:
 The WFTU functioned during the Cold War largely as a unitary organization, bringing together unions from the Communist bloc and Western unions.
 Trade Union International of Agricultural and Forestry Workers (also known as the TUI of Agricultural, Forestry and Plantation Workers)
 Trade Unions International of Building, Wood, Building Materials and Industries
 International Union of Trade Unions of Postal, Telephone and Telegraph Workers (also known as the TUI of Postal, Telegraph, Telephone and Radio Workers)
 Trade Union International of Chemical and Allied Workers
 Trade Unions International of Miners
 Trade Union International of Food, Tobacco, Hotel and Allied Industries Workers (also known as the TUI of Food, Tobacco and Catering Workers or the TUI of Food, Tobacco and Beverage Industries, and Hotel, Cafe and Restaurant Workers)
 Trade Union International of Metal and Engineering Workers (also known as the TUI of Workers in the Metal Industry)
 Trade Union International of Textile and Clothing Workers
 Trade Union International of Leather, Shoe, Fur and Leather Products
 Trade Unions International of Seamen and Dockers
 Trade Unions International of Land and Air Transport Workers

Over time, some of these original eleven would expand their bases, change their names or merge:
 In 1953, the TUIs of Seamen and Dockers and Land and Air Transport Workers merged to form the Trade Unions International of Transport, Port and Fishery Workers. By 1985, this union had adopted its present name, Trade Unions International of Transport Workers.
 In 1954 the TUI of Chemical and Allied Workers expanded its sectoral base and became the Trade Unions International of Chemical, Oil and Allied Workers.
 In 1955 the International Union of Trade Unions of Postal, Telephone and Telegraph Workers expanded its scope to all public employees and became the Trade Unions International of Public and Allied Employees.
 In 1958 the TUIs of Leather, Shoe, Fur and Leather Products and of Textile and Clothing Workers merged to form the Trade Union International of Textile, Leather and Fur Workers Unions.
 In 1983 the TUI of Miners expanded its scope and became the Trade Unions International of Miners and Energy Workers. In 1986 it became the Trade Unions International of Energy Workers before ceasing activities.

Other than the initial eleven, two new TUIs were formed during the course of the Cold War:
Trade Union International of Workers in Commerce formed in 1959
Standing Committee of Trade Unions in the Graphic Industry formed in 1961, allied with, but not formally affiliated to the WFTU.

Post-Cold War developments 
After the dissolution of the Eastern bloc, the Trade Unions International of Energy Workers and the Trade Union International of Metal and Engineering Workers temporarily suspended operations. In 1998 a conference was held in Havana which merged these two organizations and the Trade Union International of Chemical, Oil and Allied Workers in a new group, Trade Union International of Energy, Metal, Chemical, Oil and Allied Industries. This organization was reorganized again as the Trade Unions International of Energy Workers in 2007. This left the metal workers an opportunity create a new TUI the next year, Trade Union International of Workers in the Mining, the Metallurgy and the Metal Industries.

In 1997 the Trade Union International of Agroalimentary, Food, Commerce, Textile & Allied Industries was formed by the merger of the Trade Union International of Agricultural, Forestry and Plantation Workers, Trade Union International of Food, Tobacco, Hotel and Allied Industries Workers, Trade Union International of Workers in Commerce, Trade Union International of Textile, Leather and Fur Workers Unions.

The Trade Union International of Workers in Tourism and Hotels was founded in 2009, the Trade Union International of Banks, Insurance and Financial Unions Employees in 2011 and the Trade Union International of Pensioners and Retired Persons in 2014.  In 2020, a new Trade Union International of Textile-Garment-Leather was founded.

Leadership

General Secretaries
1945: Louis Saillant
1969: Pierre Gensous
1978: Enrique Pastorino
1982: Ibrahim Zakaria
1990: Alexander Zharikov
2005: George Mavrikos
2022: Pambis Kyritsis

Presidents
1945: Walter Citrine
1946: Arthur Deakin
1949: Giuseppe Di Vittorio
1959: Agostino Novella
1961: Renato Bitossi
1969: Enrique Pastorino
1975: Sándor Gáspár
1989: Indrajit Gupta
1990: Ibrahim Zakaria
1994: Antonio Neto
2000: K. L. Mahendra
2005: Shaban Assouz
2016: Mzwandile Makwayiba

See also 

 List of federations of trade unions
 List of trade unions
 Predecessors:
 International Federation of Trade Unions
 Profintern
 Successor:  International Confederation of Free Trade Unions

References

Bibliography 
 Fabio BERTINI, Gilliatt e la piovra. Il sindacalismo internazionale dalle origini ad oggi (1776–2006), Roma, Aracne, 2011

External links 

 
Guide to World Federation of Trade Unions. Reports and Minutes, 1945–1949. 5396mf. Kheel Center for Labor-Management Documentation and Archives, Martin P. Catherwood Library, Cornell University.

 
Trade unions established in 1945
Organizations based in Prague
Organizations based in Athens
International and regional union federations